Jason Steele (born July 26, 1948) is an American politician who was a Republican member of the Florida House of Representatives from 1980 to 1982. His district included portions of Brevard County. He was born in Fort Lauderdale, Florida.

He lost his bid for Florida House District 31 to replace term-limited Representative Mitch Needelman.  He ran against Ken Babington, Ron Stump, and John Tobia. Tobia won.

In March 2009, Steele filed to run against John Tobia in the 2010 election cycle, but rescinded his name in the summer of 2009.

Career
Steele's earliest experience was as a personal aide to Governor Claude Kirk.

In 1981 Steele served on the committee for Tourism, Economic Development and Transportation, Private Property Rights. He served as the Chairman of the Brevard County Legislative committee.

In 1993 Steele was seated as the Liaison to the Florida Real Estate Education Foundation. In 1994 he became an Agency Task Force committee member. In 1992 he became the Chairman of the Florida Real Estate Commission. Before this he was the Vice-Chairman.

In 1981 Steele ran an unsuccessful campaign for the Florida Senate. He also ran an unsuccessful campaign in 1984 for the Florida House of Representatives.

From 1980–1982 Steele served in the Florida House of Representatives for District 44.

2004 to 2008 Prevent Board of Directors
2002 to 2008 Member Hubbs-Seaworld Research Institute Florida
1985 to 2008 Founder, and Member of Space Coast Tiger Bay Club
1992 Chairman Florida Real Estate Commission

Professional experience
Steele is currently a Managing Broker for Coldwell Banker Ed Schlitt in Melbourne, Florida. From 2002-2004 he was the Director of the Division of Real Estate for the State of Florida. Circuit Court Judge George Maxwell appointed Steele the receiver for the Brevard Builder Group in 2002. In his early life, 1976–2003, he was Vice President of the Steele Company out of Indialantic, Florida.

Steele has been an expert witness and has been retained for legal opinion on real estate cases in the state of Florida. He was also appointed by Governor Bob Martinez to be a Florida Real Estate Commissioner for 8 years. He has been a Real Estate Instructor since 1980.

Education
Steele is an I.T.I. Trained Real Estate Instructor for GRI,  Fair Housing, Sales and Marketing, Environmental Permitting, Agency, and Law. He attended Florida State University. He was awarded an associate degree from Broward Community College. Attended St. Thomas Aquinas High School (Fort Lauderdale, Florida). He graduated from Stranahan High School Ft. Lauderdale.

References

External links
Jason Steele's Realtor Site

Living people
Republican Party members of the Florida House of Representatives
Florida State University alumni
Politicians from Fort Lauderdale, Florida
1948 births
Broward College alumni